El Congrés i els Indians is a neighborhood in the Sant Andreu district of Barcelona, Catalonia, Spain.

Neighbourhoods of Barcelona
Sant Andreu